Eva K. Grebel is a German astronomer. Since 2007 she has been co-director of the Astronomisches Rechen-Institut at the University of Heidelberg in Germany. Eva Grebel is an expert in the study of stellar populations and galaxy formation.

Research
Grebel's research is focused on the stars of the Milky Way galaxy and other members of the local group of galaxies, including the Large and Small Magellanic Clouds as well as nearby dwarf galaxies. Grebel's studies concern the chemical evolution and structure of galaxies, star formation and the properties of the various stellar populations, with the aim of reconstructing the origin and evolution of the Milky Way and other galaxies.

Biography
Grebel studied physics and astronomy at the University of Bonn, obtaining her Diplom degree in physics in 1991. For part of the same year, she was a summer student at the Space Telescope Science Institute in Baltimore.

She took up graduate studies at the University of Bonn, spending two years in 1992–1994 as a student fellow at the European Southern Observatory's La Silla Observatory in Chile. She obtained her PhD in 1995 with distinction. Her dissertation topic was "Stellar population studies in nearby galaxies".

Subsequently, Grebel took at postdoc positions at the University of Illinois at Urbana-Champaign (1995–1996), at Würzburg University (1996–1997) and at the University of California, Santa Cruz (1997–1998). She won a Hubble Fellowship in 1998, joining the University of Washington in Seattle as a Hubble fellow 1998–2000.

In 2000, Grebel returned to Germany as a research group leader at the Max Planck Institute for Astronomy in Heidelberg. In 2003, she accepted an appointment to the chair of observational astronomy at the Astronomical Institute of the University of Basel, as the successor of Gustav Tammann. From 2004–2007, she served as the institute's director.

In 2007, Grebel was appointed a Full Professor of Astronomy at Heidelberg University, where she also became one of two directors of the Astronomisches Rechen-Institut. At that time, Grebel was the only female full professor for astronomy in Germany.

Grebel is the chair of the DFG-Collaborative Research Center 881 "The Milky Way System" at the University of Heidelberg and president of commission H1 "The Local Universe" of the International Astronomical Union.

Awards and prizes
2021 Member of the German Academy of Sciences Leopoldina
2015 Hector Science Award and Member of the Hector Fellow Academy
2006 Johann Wempe Award, AIP
1999 Henri Chrétien International Research Grant Award, AAS
1996 Ludwig Biermann Award, Astronomische Gesellschaft

References

External links
 Eva Grebel's home page
 List of Biermann Award winners, German Astronomical Society
 Eva Grebel on Academia.net

21st-century German astronomers
Ludwig Biermann Award winners
Women astronomers
Living people
1966 births
Members of the German Academy of Sciences Leopoldina